Sally Sussman Morina is an American documentary filmmaker, television writer, and producer.

Personal life
She is married to Anthony Morina, a CBS Daytime director and producer.  She has gone by her married name Sally Sussman Morina on various projects. She is based in Santa Monica, California.

Career
In May 2016, the feature documentary, Midnight Return: The Story of Billy Hayes and Turkey which was Directed, Written and Produced by Sally Sussman had its World Premiere at the Cannes Film Festival.   The film has shown in festivals all over the world and is currently in its theatrical release and available on Sundance Now.  https://pro-labs.imdb.com/title/tt3511510/?ref_=sch_int

On September 15, 2016, it was confirmed that Sussman  was named as The Young and the Restlesss new head writer and Co-Executive Producer. Sussman's tenure as head writer began taping on October 20, 2016, and is aired on December 7, 2016. On July 31, 2017, Daytime Confidential announced that both Kay Alden and Sussman will be departing from the show, with Mal Young being named as the new head writer.

Positions held

Midnight Return: The Story of Billy Hayes and Turkey
 Director/Writer/Producer
The Young and the Restless
Head Writer: December 7, 2016 – October 24, 2017
Co-Executive Producer: December 7, 2016 – October 24, 2017
Associate Head Writer: June 10, 2005 - November 2006
Breakdown Writer: June 10, 2005 - November 2006
Writer: 1984 - 1988
Storyline Consultant: January 1983 – 1988 (hired by William J. Bell), May 17, 2005 - May 12, 2006 (hired by John F. Smith)
The Facts of Life
Writer

Knots Landing 
Writer

Freshman Dorm
Writer

Another World
Script Writer: 1996

Days of Our Lives
Head Writer: January 8, 1998 - October 15, 1999
Co-Head Writer: November 21, 1997 - January 5, 1998
Associate Head Writer: 1996-1997 (hired by James E. Reilly)

Generations
Creator
Head Writer: March 27, 1989 - January 25, 1991
Executive Producer: March 27, 1989 - January 25, 1991

Spyder Games
Executive Producer: 2001
Head Writer: 2001

Awards and nominationsCannes Film FestivalNominated, Golden Camera

Midnight Return: The Story of Billy Hayes and Turkey

Nominated, Golden Eye

Midnight Return: The Story of Billy Hayes and TurkeyDaytime Emmy Awards 
NOMINATIONS (1998, 1999; Best Writing; Days Of Our Lives) & (1986, 1987 & 2006 Best Writing; The Young And The Restless)
WIN (2006; Best Writing; The Young And The Restless)Writers Guild of America Award'
NOMINATIONS: (2005 & 2006 season; The Young And The Restless); (1999 season; Days Of Our Lives)  
WINS: (2005 season; The Young And The Restless); (1999 season; Days Of Our Lives)

Head writing tenures

Executive Producing Tenure

References

External links

Living people
American soap opera writers
Soap opera producers
Writers Guild of America Award winners
Place of birth missing (living people)
Year of birth missing (living people)
American women television writers
Women soap opera writers
American women television producers
21st-century American women writers